Abel Verônico da Silva Filho (born 2 October 1941), sometimes known as just Abel, is a Brazilian retired footballer who played as a forward.

Honours
Santos
Intercontinental Supercup: 1968
Recopa Sudamericana: 1968
Campeonato Paulista: 1967, 1968, 1969

References

External links

1941 births
Living people
Footballers from Rio de Janeiro (city)
Brazilian footballers
Association football forwards
America Football Club (RJ) players
Santos FC players
Coritiba Foot Ball Club players
Londrina Esporte Clube players
Botafogo Futebol Clube (SP) players
Atlas F.C. footballers
Brazil international footballers
Brazilian expatriate footballers
Brazilian expatriate sportspeople in Mexico
Expatriate footballers in Mexico